Callipelis is a genus of ground spiders containing the single species, Callipelis deserticola. It was  first described by Alireza Zamani & Yuri M. Marusik in 2017, and is only found in Iran.

References

External links

Gnaphosidae
Monotypic Araneomorphae genera